The Downtown Core is the historical and downtown centre of the city-state of Singapore and the main commercial area in Singapore excluding reclaimed lands with many integrated resorts such as the Marina Bay Sands, one of the most expensive buildings in the world, with a luxurious standalone casino at Bayfront Avenue. There are many skyscrapers in Raffles Place, Tanjong Pagar and Marina Bay CBD with a height limit of 280m. It is one of the eleven planning areas located within the most urbanised Central Area, forming the latter's dense urban core. It is bounded by Rochor to the north, Kallang to the northeast, Marina East and Marina South to the east, Straits View to the southeast, Bukit Merah to the south, as well as Outram, Museum and Singapore River to the west.

As the financial Heart of Singapore, the Downtown Core houses the headquarters and offices of numerous corporations, as well as the Singapore Exchange. The area is also home to many governmental institutions, notably the seat of Parliament and the Supreme Court of Singapore.

Singapore's modern history began in this area, when Stamford Raffles and representatives of the British East India Company landed along the banks of the Singapore River to set up a free port in Southeast Asia. As the old harbour grew along the mouth of the river bank, the city naturally expanded around it, creating what is now the Central Area.

The name "Downtown Core" remains relatively unheard of and the term Central Business District (CBD) is commonly used in conversation instead. However, the area known as the CBD actually comprises a smaller area within the Downtown Core itself, taking up the south-western and western portions of the planning area, consisting largely of many skyscrapers. It is made up of eight subzones, Anson, Cecil, Clifford Pier, Maxwell, Phillip, Raffles Place and Tanjong Pagar and Marina Centre. The core of the CBD has since extended well beyond its boundaries and the term is even often at times used to refer to the Central Area as a whole.

History

As a fledgling colony, the area which is now known as the Downtown Core was the financial, administrative and commercial centre of the colony. In 1823, Singapore was reorganised according to the Raffles Plan of Singapore by Sir Stamford Raffles, which specified elements like the Commercial Square (now Raffles Place) and the European Town as well as various other commercial and administrative entities located between them. This area later became the Downtown Core.

References

External links
 Draft Master Plan 2003 - Central Region

Downtown Core (Singapore)
Singapore